The Goose Creek Symphony is an American rock band with roots in Arizona and Kentucky. They were formed in 1968 in Phoenix, Arizona as an outlet for the songs of Charlie Gearheart, aka Ritchie Hart, and were best known for their 1972 cover of Janis Joplin's song, "Mercedes Benz".

Career
The band recorded their first album at Audio Recorders in 1968-69 and were subsequently signed to Capitol Records in 1970. They continued recording until 1976, then reformed in 1990.  The band is considered one of the tightest, musically, of its genre and has continued touring to popular acclaim.

The band appeared on The Ed Sullivan Show with Bobbie Gentry and shared the stage with Jimi Hendrix and The Allman Brothers Band among others at the 1970 Atlanta Pop Festival. Charlie Gearheart performed on American Bandstand as Ritchie Hart in 1959. The Goose Creek Symphony has been inducted into "The Arizona Music and Entertainment Hall of Fame"  class of 2011.

In the '70s they fit into a country rock mode, but were more esoteric than many of their contemporaries and they had a rawer, less commercial sound. The band recorded three eclectic albums for Capitol, Est 1970, (1970) Welcome to Goose Creek (1971) and Words of Earnest (1972).  All were moderately successful with the last boasting a hit single cover of Janis Joplin's “Mercedes Benz.”   Re-mastered versions of these discs are available on the group's website (http://www.GooseCreekSymphony.com).  In 1974 the band moved over to Columbia Records and recorded, to less success, Do Your Thing But Don't Touch Mine. Shortly thereafter the band took a hiatus which lasted almost 17 years.

In the years since they resurfaced, they have played many festivals and released several albums, including a live set, The Goose Is Loose, in 1995, which highlights their extended jamming, witness the meandering 20 minutes or so of “Talk About Goose Creek and Other Important Places.” Also released is the Acoustic Goose live album, as well as studio albums, including Going Home (1998) and I Don't Know (2003). They have also released a couple of lost albums, such as Head For the Hills (recorded in 1975-76 and released in 1997) and recently The Same Thing Again (one music CD and a bonus DVD). The latter was recorded in the mid-70s and essentially forgotten for three decades. Ironically the title cut has Gearheart singing, “If I could live my life over I'd do the same thing again, for 20 long years I’ve picked and I’ve sung.”

Discography
Established 1970 (1970, Capitol)
Welcome to Goose Creek (1971, Capitol)
Words of Earnest (1972, Capitol)Platinum
Do Your Thing But Don't Touch Mine (1974, Columbia)
Head For The Hills (never released album from 1975–76, Bootlegged 1977, 1997 CD-release, 2009 CD-re-release w/bonus track )
Oso Special (Recorded 1985, Released 1990, June Appal)
Live at Appal Shop (1991, June Appal, lim. Rel.,1997 re-released as "Acoustic Goose")
The Goose Is Loose (1995, 2CD private rel.,1996 single CD, Winter Harvest, 2007 2 CD  re-release )
Goin' Home (2002)
I Don't Know (2003)
Goose on the Lake 2004 (2004)
Live at the Mountain Arts Center (2004)
Goose on the Lake 2007 (2007)
The Same Thing Again (recorded 1977, released 2008)

Radio and television appearances
Goose Creek's mixed genre versatility is demonstrated in their 2003 appearance as sole guest on show 259 of the WoodSongs Old-Time Radio Hour.  The WoodSongs Archive has both the radio program and a 111-minute video of the show which includes 20 minutes of performance not included in the hour-long radio show.

References

External links
[ Allmusic]
website
Current 6-22-09 Video of Gob Sows

American folk rock groups
American country rock groups
Americana music groups